Pinedo may refer to:

People
Ainhoa Pinedo (born 1983), Spanish race walker 
Alejandro de Pinedo (born 1965), Spanish composer, author, and music producer
Bonifacio Pinedo (died 1954), Afro Bolivian king
Cora Cecilia Pinedo (born 1967), Mexican politician
Elisabeth Pinedo (born 1981), Spanish handball player
Federico Pinedo (born1955), Argentine politician
Francesco de Pinedo (1890–1933), Italian aviator
Gustavo Pinedo (born 1988), Bolivian footballer
Iñaki Ruiz de Pinedo (born 1954), Spanish politician
Jazmín Pinedo (born 1990), Peruvian television host
Jorge Ortiz de Pinedo (born 1948), Mexican comedian and actor
José María Pinedo (1795–1885), Argentine commander in the navy of the United Provinces of the River Plate
Julio Pinedo (born 1953), ceremonial king of the Afro Bolivian community of the Nor Yungas province
Mario Pinedo (born 1964), Bolivian footballer 
Nelson Pinedo (1928–2016), Colombian singer
Óscar Ortiz de Pinedo (1910–1978), Cuban actor
Patricia Pinedo (born 1981), Spanish handball player

Places
Pinedo (Valencia), a village in Spain
General Pinedo, Chaco, a town in Argentina
Tnte. Gral. Gerardo Pérez Pinedo Airport, Atalaya, Ucayali Region, Peru

See also
General Pinedo (disambiguation)